Alan Foster may refer to:
Alan Dean Foster (born 1946), science fiction novelist
Alan Foster (baseball) (born 1946), player active in the 1960s
Alan Foster (BMX rider) (born 1970), American BMX racer
Alan Foster (footballer) (born 1971), Scottish footballer

See also 
Allen Foster (c. 1887–1916), Reading Football Club player in the pre–World War I era
 C. Allen Foster, American lawyer
Allen Foster Cooper (1862–1917), Republican politician representing Pennsylvania